Xylotoles pattesoni is a species of beetle in the family Cerambycidae. It was described by Olliff in 1888. It is known from Australia and New Zealand.

References

Dorcadiini
Beetles described in 1888